"" ("The Portuguese [song]") is the national anthem of Portugal. The song was composed by Alfredo Keil and written by Henrique Lopes de Mendonça during the resurgent nationalist movement ignited by the 1890 British Ultimatum to Portugal concerning its African colonies. Used as the marching song of the failed republican rebellion of January 1891, in Porto, it was adopted as the national anthem of the newborn Portuguese Republic in 1911, replacing "Hino da Carta" (Hymn of the Charter), the anthem of the deposed constitutional monarchy.

History

On 11 January 1890, the United Kingdom issued an ultimatum demanding that Portugal refrain from colonizing land lying between the Portuguese colonies of Angola, on the west coast of Africa, and Mozambique, on the east coast, thereby forming one contiguous polity (as proposed on the Pink Map). Despite a popular uproar, the Portuguese government accepted their demands. This contributed to the unpopularity of King Carlos I and the monarchy, and it garnered support for the increasingly popular republican movement in Portugal.

The night after the ultimatum was accepted, composer Alfredo Keil, at the suggestion of a group of friends that included Rafael Bordalo Pinheiro and Teófilo Braga, wrote the melody for "A Portuguesa" as a patriotic protest march. Inspired by the outrage felt by the Portuguese people, the lyricist, Henrique Lopes de Mendonça, accepted Keil's request to create words to suit his melody. Mendonça said "A Portuguesa" was a song "in which the fatherland's wounded soul would merge with its ambitions of freedom and revival"; he hoped it would be an anthem, embraced by the people, that could express their yearning for national vindication. Such expressions are epitomized by "La Marseillaise", the Portuguese fado, and "Hino da Maria da Fonte". The march was quickly disseminated; several thousands of copies of the sheet music were freely distributed, together with fliers and posters. The song's popularity also spread across national borders, and verses were translated into other languages.

On several stages in Lisbon, "A Portuguesa" drew special attention. On 29 March 1890, the march was performed at the Great Patriotic Concert, held at the Teatro Nacional de São Carlos (Saint Charles National Theatre), as well as at every other theatre in the capital. Beyond its use in cultural displays, "A Portuguesa" was also exploited for commercial gain. Several food products, including canned sardines and cookies, were named for this song.

However, the song was perceived as a political weapon, and it was soon converted into a republican hymn. This political co-option of the theme's original meaning forced both authors to disavow this vision and stress its purely non-partisan sentiments. On 31 January 1891, a republican-inspired rebellion broke out in the northern city of Porto and "A Portuguesa" was adopted by the rebels as their marching song. The rebellion was crushed, and the song was banned. However, it was never forgotten, and, on 5 October 1910, a new and stronger rebellion developed as "A Portuguesa" played in the background. A year later, the first session of the Constituent Assembly officially proclaimed it as the national anthem.

In 1956, the emergence of melodic variants of the anthem forced the government to create a committee whose aim was to define an official version. On 16 July 1957, the current version was proposed, and it was approved by the Council of Ministers.

Lyrics
The anthem's official version consists of the first stanza and the chorus from Mendonça's poem only.

Protocol
Within Portugal, the anthem is played at both civilian and military ceremonies where the country, flag, or head of state (the President of the Republic) is honoured. It is also played at receptions for foreign heads of state, following that of the visitor, and in ceremonies during official presidential visits to other countries.

Notes

References

External links

 Sung audio
 National Anthem from the President of Portugal
 Hino Nacional by Museum of the Presidency of the Republic 
 , by RTP1, 1980

European anthems
National symbols of Portugal
Portuguese anthems
Portuguese patriotic songs
Songs about Portugal
1890 songs
Portuguese-language songs
Compositions by Alfredo Keil
National anthems
National anthem compositions in E-flat major